Arnold Long (born 18 December 1940 in Cheam) is an English former first-class cricketer. He played for Surrey between 1960 and 1975, then spent the remainder of his career at Sussex, whom he captained between 1978 and 1980, during which time they won the 1978 Gillette Cup. A wicket-keeper and left-handed batsman, Long claimed 1046 victims from his 452 games over a 20-year career. Of these, 805 were for Surrey between 1960 and 1975, putting him third in the county's all-time wicketkeeping records. In 1962 he took 74 catches, and made 91 dismissals in all, both of which are Surrey records for one season. He was a member of the Surrey side that won the County Championship in 1971

References

 

1940 births
Living people
People from Cheam
English cricketers
Surrey cricketers
Marylebone Cricket Club cricketers
Sussex cricketers
Sussex cricket captains
International Cavaliers cricketers
D. H. Robins' XI cricketers
Wicket-keepers